Romuald Hausser (born 16 April 1988 in Geneva) is a Swiss sailor, who specialized in two-person dinghy (470) class. He represented Switzerland, along with his partner Yannick Brauchli, at the 2012 Summer Olympics, and has also been training for Versoix Nautical Club throughout most of his sporting career under his personal coach Nicolas Novara. As of September 2014, Hausser is ranked sixteenth in the world for two-person dinghy class by the International Sailing Federation, following his successes at the North American Championships, European Championships and ISAF Sailing World Cup Series.

Hausser qualified as a crew member for the Swiss squad in the men's 470 class at the 2012 Summer Olympics in London by placing twenty-sixth at the ISAF World Championships in Perth, Western Australia. Teaming with skipper Yannick Brauchli in the opening series, the Swiss duo recorded a score of 119 net points to establish a sixteenth-place finish in a fleet of twenty-seven boats.

The pair also competed at the 2016 Summer Olympics, finishing in 9th place.

References

External links
 
 
 
 
 

1988 births
Living people
Swiss male sailors (sport)
Olympic sailors of Switzerland
Sailors at the 2012 Summer Olympics – 470
Sailors at the 2016 Summer Olympics – 470
Sportspeople from Geneva
21st-century Swiss people